Pistelli is an Italian surname. Notable people with the surname include:

Ermenegildo Pistelli (1862–1927), Italian papyrologist, palaeographer, philologist, and presbyter
Lapo Pistelli (born 1964), Italian politician

See also
Pistilli

Italian-language surnames